The Emulator is a series of digital sampling synthesizers using floppy disk storage, manufactured by E-mu Systems from 1981 until 2002. Though not the first commercial sampler, the Emulator was among the first to find wide use among ordinary musicians, due to its relatively low price and fairly contained size, which allowed for its use in live performances. It was also innovative in its integration of computer technology. The samplers were discontinued in 2002.

Impetus
E-mu Systems was founded in 1971 and began business as a manufacturer of microprocessor chips, digital scanning keyboards and components for electronic instruments. Licensing this technology gave E-mu ample funds to invest in research and development, and it began to develop boutique synthesizers for niche markets, including a series of modular synthesizers and the high-end Audity system. In 1979, founders Scott Wedge and Dave Rossum saw the Fairlight CMI and the Linn LM-1 at a convention, inspiring them to design and produce a less expensive keyboard that made use of digital sampling.

Originally, E-mu considered selling the design for the Emulator to Sequential Circuits, which at the time was using E-mu's keyboard design in its popular Prophet-5 synthesizer. However, soon afterward, Sequential Circuits stopped paying E-mu royalties on its keyboard design, which forced E-mu to release the Emulator itself.

Products

Emulator

Finally released in 1981, the Emulator was a floppy disk-based keyboard workstation which enabled the musician to sample sounds, recording them to non-volatile media and allowing the samples to be played back as musical notes on the keyboard. The 5" floppy disk drive enabled the owner to build a library of samples and share them with others, or buy pre-recorded libraries on disk.

The Emulator had a very basic 8-bit sampler; it only had a simple filter, and only allowed for a single loop. The initial model did not even include a VCA envelope generator. It came in three forms: A two-voice model (only one of these was ever sold), a four-voice model, and an eight-voice model. When the original Emulator was turned on the keyboard was split. It was designed to be played in split mode, so playing the same sound on the full keyboard required loading up the same sound floppy disk in each drive.

Stevie Wonder, who gave the sampler a glowing review at the 1981 NAMM convention, received the first unit (serial number "0001"). Originally 0001 was promised to Daryl Dragon of Captain & Tennille, because he had been a loyal E-mu modular system owner for a long time before that. However, Wonder was more famous. In 1982, the Emulator was updated to include a VCA envelope generator and a simple sequencer, and the price was lowered. Approximately 500 units were sold before the unit was discontinued in early 1984. Other prominent users of the original E-mu Emulator were New Order, Tangerine Dream and Genesis, and it was among the many groundbreaking instruments used in the production of Michael Jackson's Thriller album. Composer and Writer David Frank of The System used the original Emulator on his productions from Sweat to Don't Disturb this Groove. The Residents, who had gotten the fifth Emulator to ever be produced, used the instrument extensively on their album The Tunes of Two Cities.

Emulator II

Released commercially in 1984 to huge acclaim, the Emulator II (or EII) was E-mu's second sampler. Like the original Emulator, it was an 8-bit sampler, however it had superior fidelity to the Emulator due to the use of digital companding and a 27.7 kHz sample rate. It also allowed more flexibility in editing and shaping sounds, as resonant analog filters were added. The EII also had vastly better real time control. It was priced similarly to the original Emulator, at US$7,995 for a regular model, and $9,995 for a 'plus' model featuring extra sample memory. Several upgrades, including a second floppy drive, a 20 MB hard drive, and a 512K memory upgrade were also available. Despite its price tag it was still considered very good value compared to the Fairlight CMI Series II, which, when first released, was priced at $30,000.

The Emulator II has a unique sound due to its DPCM mu-255 companding, divider-based variable sample-rate principle and analog output stages featuring SSM2045 24 dB/oct analogue four-pole low-pass resonant filters. Equivalent output stages in modern samplers perform similar functions purely in the digital domain, and aficionados of the sound of analogue electronics argue that some of this analogue 'magic' is lost.

Several highly respected OEM and third party sample libraries were developed for the Emulator II, including a multitude of high quality orchestral sounds. Many of the EII's original library sounds were sampled from the more expensive Fairlight and Synclavier workstations (the Fairlight's famous "Sarrar/Arr1" choir sample is called "DigiVcs" in the E-mu library). This can cause confusion when trying to determine which sampler hardware was actually used on a certain song. A demo of the library sounds can be found on YouTube. Famous samples include the Shakuhachi flute used by Peter Gabriel on "Sledgehammer" and by Enigma on their album MCMXC a.D., and the Marcato Strings heard on many popular '80s records, including the Pet Shop Boys' "West End Girls". According to the Pet Shop Boys' Neil Tennant in "Synth Britannia" on BBC 4 in 2009, every single sound on the track, with the obvious exception of the singers' voices, was made using an Emulator II.

The Emulator II was popular with many musicians in the 1980s, such as early adopter Stevie Wonder, and was used extensively by Front 242, Depeche Mode, 808 State (on their 1989 album Ninety) New Order, ABC, Genesis, Paul McCartney, David Bowie, Herbie Hancock, Vangelis, Tangerine Dream, Jean-Michel Jarre, Yes, OMD, Stevie Nicks, Mr. Mister, and many more. The list is far from complete however as it became the staple sampler of just about every recording studio that could afford one in the 1980s, and thus was used on a multitude of albums at the time.

It was used for a number of film scores as well, such as the Terminator 2: Judgment Day score by Brad Fiedel, many of Michael Kamen's film scores, such as Lethal Weapon and Highlander and almost all of John Carpenter's films in the 1980s. It even featured in the movie Ferris Bueller's Day Off, where Ferris uses the Emulator II to play sounds of coughing and sneezing in order to feign illness on the phone. David Foster made mention of using his Emu II during the 1985 documentary for Tears Are Not Enough, when he recorded one Middle C note of a French horn with help from studio musician Steven Denroche, which then went on to be used in the Tears Are Not Enough single. Denroche was credited in the documentary for the French horn, even though Foster ultimately performed the melody himself on the keyboard after the sound was recorded on the Emu II.

In recent years, the Emulator II has risen in popularity due to the resurgence in 1980s pop culture, with new artists wishing to revive the Emulator-based sound. Prices for functioning units have gone up, and websites dedicated to selling the original floppies have now emerged.

Emulator III

The Emulator III was introduced after the discontinuation of the Emulator II in 1987, and was manufactured until 1991. A rack-mountable version was introduced in 1988.

It featured 4 or 8 megabytes of memory, depending on the model, and it could store samples in 16-bit, 44 kHz stereo, which at the time, was equivalent to the most advanced, professional equipment available. The sound quality was also improved greatly over its predecessors, the Emulator I and II, with quieter outputs and more reliable filter chips. However, the Emulator III was considerably less popular than its predecessors, largely due to its price at a time when manufacturers such as Akai, Ensoniq and Casio offered samplers at less than $2,000, the Emulator III's use of high-quality components drove the price up to $12,695 for the 4 MB model, and $15,195 for the 8 MB model. E-mu had previously been able to sell its Emulators at around the $10,000 range because the only alternatives were the $30,000–200,000 Fairlight CMI, and the $75,000–500,000 NED Synclavier system. However, times had changed, the technology had become more and more accessible and E-mu was not able to keep up.

Although the Emulator III may not have been a success with working musicians, it did find a place on the records and in the studios of many prominent artists, including Tony Banks of Genesis, Lynda Thomas, 808 state (on their 1991 album Ex:el) (live performance) and Depeche Mode, who used it on their successful 1990 album, Violator.

Emulator IV and EOS

The Emulator IV (EIV) series of samplers was introduced in 1994. The new operating system used in the EIV was known as the Emulator Operating System or EOS, which was updated regularly by e-mu. Early EIV models with only 1MB of CPU Flash can be updated to 3.00b, while later models with 2MB or more can be updated to EOS 4.62 (non-Ultra) or EOS 4.7 (Ultra). There have been rumors that EOS 4.8 was in development and included support for USB transfers.

The Emulator IV was the first to be released, a rack sampler that came with 128 voices and memory expansion up to a then-massive 128MB. Options included a multi-effects processor, additional output sockets and 32 MIDI channels.

The e64 was launched soon after the Emulator IV, and in order to meet a lower price point it was limited to only 64 voices and a maximum 64MB of memory. It was soon joined by the E4K, essentially an E64 with a 76-key weighted keyboard - although it could be expanded to 128 voices and 128MB of memory - like the later e6400.

A second series of rackmount EIV was launched in 1996, with the E4X Turbo being the new 128-voice flagship model. The E4X (without Turbo) and e6400 offered only 64 voices and fewer options once again to meet lower price points - although unlike the e64 it was fully upgradable. In this time frame e-mu released the E-Synth in both rack and keyboard form, these models including a 16MB sound ROM, and an optional additional 16MB "Dance" sound ROM, installed at the factory which offered musicians an instant sound set as soon as the instrument booted up (unlike other hardware samplers which required a hard disk or CD-ROM to load content after booting).

The final EIV samplers all have the "Ultra" designation. The Ultra samplers featured a very fast processor and upgraded analog output stages, and the ability to install the RFX dedicated high-quality effects processor. The entry-level model in this series was the E5000 Ultra, which was limited to four output jacks, could not accept the voice upgrade, and was unable to write sound ROMs. The E6400 Ultra (now with a capital "E") was a stripped down model but had full upgradability, the E-Synth Ultra refined the previous E-Synth offerings with one or two new 16MB sound ROMs, and the E4XT Ultra was the top-of-the-line model with the full 128 voices, digital audio inputs and outputs, 32 MIDI channels, and an ASCII keyboard input for remote control. The final Ultra sampler was fully loaded with the RFX effects card and every option, and was called the E4 Platinum.

The EIV series was discontinued in 2002.

Notable players
The following musicians have played an E-mu Emulator series sampler in their recordings:
 ABC
 David Bowie
 Matthew Broderick (as Ferris Bueller) used an Emulator to play samples of coughing in Ferris Bueller's Day Off
 Daft Punk used the ESI-32 sampler for their first few singles and their studio album Homework
 Depeche Mode used Emulators I, II, and III in studio recordings and in live performances
 Enya
 Front 242
 Genesis used Emulators I, II, and III
 Philip Glass
 Herbie Hancock
 Jean-Michel Jarre used an Emulator on Zoolook and Revolutions, and an Emulator II in Rendez-Vous.
 Kitaro
 Paul McCartney
 Mr. Mister used an Emulator II (featured prominently on "Broken Wings")
 New Order
 Orchestral Manoeuvres in the Dark
 Pet Shop Boys used an Emulator II (notable for Marcato strings sound in "West End Girls")
 Tangerine Dream
 Simple Minds used an Emulator II
 Vangelis
 Brian Wilson
 Stevie Wonder purchased the first production Emulator I
 Yes
 Margita Stefanović
 Yellow Magic Orchestra

See also
 E-mu Emax
 Sampler (musical instrument)

References

Further reading

External links
 1980s Interview with Philip Oakey from The Human League about the use of computers and the Emulator in pop music
 E-mu Emulator II demo & pictures
 E-mu E4XT Ultra Demo Part 5
 Emu E4X - Sound On Sound review (archive.org)

Samplers (musical instrument)
E-mu synthesizers